In People's Republic of China (1949–), revolutionary operas or model operas (Simplified Chinese: yangban xi, 样板戏) were a series of shows planned and engineered during the Cultural Revolution (1966–1976) by Jiang Qing, the wife of Chairman Mao Zedong. They were considered revolutionary and modern in terms of thematic and musical features when compared with traditional Chinese operas. Many of them were adapted to film.

Originally, eight revolutionary operas (Chinese: Ba Ge Yangban Xi, 八个样板戏) were produced, eighteen by the end of the period. Instead of the "emperors, kings, generals, chancellors, maidens, and beauties" of the traditional Peking opera, which was banned as "feudalistic and bourgeois," they told stories from China's recent revolutionary struggles against foreign and class enemies. They glorified the People's Liberation Army and the bravery of the common people, and showed Mao Zedong and his thought as playing the central role in the victory of communism in China. Although they originated as operas, they soon appeared on LPs, in comic books (lianhuanhua), on posters, postcards, and stamps; on plates, teapots, wash basins, cigarette packages, vases, and calendars. They were performed or played from loudspeakers in schools, factories, and fields by special performing troupes.  The Eight Model Operas dominated the stage in all parts of the country during these years, leading to the joke "Eight hundred million people watched eight shows."

Origin

Jiang Qing was the chief advocate and engineer of the transformation from traditional operas to revolutionary ones, and chose the Peking opera as her "laboratory experimentation" for accomplishing this radical change in theater art. The traditional Peking opera was revolutionized in both form and content. Eight model plays were produced in the first three years of the Cultural Revolution. They consisted of five modern operas (The Legend of the Red Lantern, Shajiabang, Taking Tiger Mountain by Strategy, Raid on the White Tiger Regiment, and On the Docks), two ballets (Red Detachment of Women and The White-Haired Girl), and one symphony (also Shajiabang, which is more precisely a cantata).

The official versions of the operas were all Peking operas and were produced by either the China Peking Opera House or the Shanghai Peking Opera House, although many of them were subsequently adapted to local provincial types of operas. The ballets were produced by either the National Ballet of China or the Shanghai Ballet Company. Shajiabang was musically expanded to a symphony with a full Western orchestra, a format similar to the ninth symphony of Beethoven, with an overture and 8 movements. The Legend of the Red Lantern was also adapted to a piano-accompanied cantata by the pianist Yin Chengzong, which was basically a cycle of arias excerpted from the opera.

After 1969 several other model operas were produced, including Azalea Mountain, Battle in the Plains, and Bay of Panshi, following the original model in content and form. However it was the original eight plays that were most commonly performed. Toward the end of the Cultural Revolution, the ballet Red Detachment of Women was adapted to a Peking opera, while the Peking opera The Azalea Mountain was adapted to a ballet. These did not have a chance to become as popular as their earlier versions, and the ballet version of The Azalea Mountain was never officially released.

National implementation
Model operas were performed on stages, broadcast on the radio, made into films, and sung by millions. They were the only form of mass theatrical entertainment in China at the time. Unlike European opera, which was essentially entertainment for the elite, revolutionary opera had become a popular political art. Many ordinary Chinese citizens were familiar with the arias in these model operas and would sing them at home or on the streets. Mobile film units brought cinematic recordings of the operas into the countryside and played an important role in popularizing and standardizing the art form. The revolutionary operas were regarded as some of the newborn socialist things (shehuizhuyi xinsheng shiwu) arising during the Cultural Revolution. 

During the Cultural Revolution, one way China promoted its policy of state feminism was through revolutionary opera. Most of the eight model dramas in this period featured women as their main characters. The narratives of these women protagonists begin with them oppressed by misogyny, class position, and imperialism before liberating themselves through the discovery of their own internal strength and the Communist Party. Villains in the revolutionary operas were consistently male. 

The new revolutionary theatrical forms were praised as "shining victories" of the Cultural Revolution and Mao Zedong Thought. An article published in the Red Flag journal under a pen name stated, "The glorious achievement of revolutionary operas marked a revolution in art by the proletariat. It is the major component of our country's proletarian cultural revolution. . . . In the series of revolutionary model operas nurtured by beloved Comrade Jiang Qing, the image of proletarian heroes is established; the stage that has been controlled by landlords and representatives of the bourgeoisie for the past thousand years is now gone. The real master of history has entered the field of art and started a new era in the history of art".

The operas are often taken by its critics as paradigmatic of the proletarian-dominated art of the Cultural Revolution, and have been condemned by some as an aesthetic and cultural aberration. Author Huo Wang, a citizen in China at the time, wrote in 1998 in reference to the Cultural Revolution era: "Model operas are the only art form left in the whole of China. You cannot escape from listening to them. You hear them every time you turn on the radio. You hear them from loudspeakers every time you go outside".

In her book Red Azalea, Anchee Min describes her experiences with Mao's didactic creation, the revolutionary opera. She became a fan initially because there were not many other forms of diversion. "Entertainment was a 'dirty bourgeois word'," but the revolutionary operas were supposed to be something else, "a proletarian statement." To love or not to love the operas was a serious political question, Min writes, and "meant to be or not to be a revolutionary." For a decade the same eight operas were taught on radio and in school, and were promoted by neighborhood organizations. Min recalls:

I listened to the operas when I ate, walked and slept. I grew up with the operas. They became my cells. I decorated the porch with posters of my favorite opera heroines. I sang the operas wherever I went. My mother heard me singing in my dreams; she said that I was preserved by the operas. It was true. I could not go on a day without listening to the operas. I pasted my ear close to the radio, figuring out the singer's breaths. I imitated her. The aria was called 'I won't quit the battle until all the beasts are killed.' It was sung by Iron Plum a teenage character in an opera called The Red Lantern. I would not stop singing the aria until my vocal cords hurt. I went on pushing my voice to its highest pitch. I was able to recite all the librettos...An official yangbanxi popularization campaign began in 1970. The promotion of yangbanxi through official channels also surged in 1974 in connection with the Criticize Lin, Criticize Confucius campaign.

List of revolutionary model plays

The Eight Model Plays
 The Legend of the Red Lantern, Peking opera
 Shajiabang (沙家浜, formerly romanised as Shachiapang), Peking opera
 Taking Tiger Mountain by Strategy, Peking opera
 Raid on the White Tiger Regiment, Peking opera
 On the Docks (海港, also known as The Harbor), Peking opera
 Red Detachment of Women, ballet
 The White-Haired Girl, ballet
 Shajiabang the symphony

Later model plays
 The Azalea Mountain, Peking opera
 Song of the Dragon River, Peking opera
 The Warfare on the Plain, Peking opera
 Panshiwan, Peking opera
 Red Detachment of Women the Peking opera
Interrogating the Chair, Peking opera
 Ode to the Yimeng Mountains, ballet
 The Brother and Sister on the Prairie, ballet

Revolutionary operas after the Cultural Revolution
Although these works bear unmistakable political overtones of the time when they were created, they nonetheless had significant artistic values, and for this reason, some of the works remain popular decades after the Cultural Revolution. Some of the eight model revolutionary operas have been sent on tours around the world without much of its original political content. According to Liu Kang from Duke University:

During a 1996 North American tour, the China Central Ballet repeatedly performed The Red Detachment of Women as its grand finale, which caused postmodern audiences in Los Angeles and New York to marvel at the opera's innovative multipositionality and hybridity, in which revolutionary ideologies, exotic nativist music and dances of the Li ethnic minority on Hainan Island, and high European styles and modalities coalesce in a neo-Wagnerian Gesamtkunstwerk.

The three most popular Peking operas are The Legend of the Red Lantern, Shajiabang, and Taking Tiger Mountain by Strategy. And the ballet that still shows a considerable vitality today is Red Detachment of Women, the one that was presented to Richard Nixon, President of the United States, who visited China in 1972, seven years before the normalization of the Sino-US relationship. This performance was reenacted in a slightly surreal form in John Adams's opera Nixon in China (1985–87).

The eight model plays were the subject of the 2005 documentary film Yangbanxi, The Eight Model Works. The film Farewell My Concubine (1993), set in a Peking Opera company, shows the tension and debates within the group when the revolutionary opera replaced the old.

See also
Propaganda in the People's Republic of China
List of campaigns of the Chinese Communist Party

External links
 chinapage.com
 Slant Magazine Film Review of Yangbanxi: The Eight Model Works by Keith Uhlich
 Stephan Landsberger's Chinese Propaganda Poster Pages, "Model Operas"
 Excerpt of revolutionary opera from The Guardian

Bibliography

Notes

References
Clark, Paul (2008). The Chinese Cultural Revolution: A History. Cambridge; New York: Cambridge University Press. . Explores the culture produced including the eight "model operas."
Lois Wheeler Snow, China on Stage: An American Actress in the People's Republic (New York: Random House, 1972) . A sympathetic eyewitness account. Includes texts of several plays, and a glossary of Chinese theater and dance terms.
 Barbara Mittler. A Continuous Revolution: Making Sense of Cultural Revolution Culture. (Cambridge, Mass.: Harvard University Asia Center, Harvard East Asian Monographs,  2012).   .
 , Reviewed, Colin Mackerras, Journal of Asian Studies 69. 4 (November 2010): 1208-1210.

Chinese opera
Peking operas
Cultural Revolution
Maoist China propaganda
Jiang Qing